("standard zero") or  (short N. N. or NN ) is an outdated official vertical datum used in Germany.

History 
When the New Berlin Observatory was demolished in 1912 the reference point was moved east to the village of Hoppegarten (now part of the town of Müncheberg, Brandenburg, Germany).

References 

Vertical datums
Geography of Germany
Zero-level elevation points